Antipaluria is a genus of webspinners in the family Clothodidae. There are seven described species in Antipaluria. They are native to the Caribbean region, Central America and the northern part of South America.

Species
These seven species belong to the genus Antipaluria:

 Antipaluria aequicercata Enderlein, 1912
 Antipaluria caribbeana Ross, 1987
 Antipaluria intermedia (Davis, 1939)
 Antipaluria marginata Ross, 1987
 Antipaluria panamensis Ross, 1987
 Antipaluria silvestris Ross, 1987
 Antipaluria urichi (Saussure, 1896)

References

Embioptera